Meon is a hamlet in the Fareham district, in south Hampshire, England.

A settlement with two households was recorded in the 1086 Domesday Book at Mene. Meon Farm was an old timber and red-brick building in Meon.

References

Hamlets in Hampshire
Borough of Fareham